Qoʻshkoʻpir (Қўшкўпир, قوشكوپىر) is an urban-type settlement and seat of Qoʻshkoʻpir District in Xorazm Region in Uzbekistan. Its population is 18,700 (2016).

References

Populated places in Xorazm Region
Urban-type settlements in Uzbekistan